Nebraska Highway 97 is a highway in western Nebraska.  It has a southern terminus north of North Platte at an intersection with U.S. Highway 83.  The northern terminus is at U.S. Highway 20 in Valentine.

Route description

Nebraska Highway 97 begins to the north of North Platte branching off US 83.  It heads to the northwest through prairies where it meets NE 92 east of Tryon.  The highway runs concurrently with NE 92 to the west through Tryon, before splitting off and continuing northward.  In Mullen, the highway intersects NE 2.  It continues heading northward and to the northeast, passing the Merritt Reservoir along the way.  NE 97 also passes Nebraska Spur 16F just north of the reservoir before continuing to the northeast.  When the highway reaches Valentine, it terminates at US 20.

Major intersections

See also

References

External links

 Nebraska Roads: NE 81-100

097
Transportation in Lincoln County, Nebraska
Transportation in McPherson County, Nebraska
Transportation in Hooker County, Nebraska
Transportation in Cherry County, Nebraska